The Six Abodes of Murugan are six temples situated in the state of Tamil Nadu in South India, dedicated to the Hindu deity Murugan, also referred to as Kandaswamy, Kartikeya, Skanda, and Vadivela at various temples. These six sacred abodes of Murugan are mentioned in Tamil Sangam literature, Thirumurugatrupadai, written by Nakkeerar and in Tiruppugaḻ, written by Arunagirinathar. The six abodes are Thiruparankundram, Tiruchendur, Palani, Swamimalai, Thiruthani, and Pazhamudircholai.

Legend
The legend of Murugan is described in Kanda Puranam, the Tamil iteration of the Skanda Purana. According to the text, the asura Surapadman drove the devas out of Svarga, and the latter sought the assistance of the deities Vishnu and Brahma. They assigned Kamadeva to disturb Shiva from his penance and fall in love with Parvati, and the couple later gave birth to Murugan. Murugan slew Surapadman in battle and restored Svarga to the devas. Murugan is anointed as the commander of the devas prior to the war. Murugan married the goddesses Valli by love and married Deivayanai after the war that is regarded to have occurred at Tiruchendur.

In Tamil literature, five types of land are explained. These are the Kurinji (mountainous region), Mullai (forest region), Marutham (agricultural region), Neithal (coastal region) and Palai (desert region). Various deities are designated as the patron gods of these regions in Sangam literature. According to these texts, Murugan is the deity of the Kurinji region.

Religious importance 

Arunagirinathar was a 15th-century Tamil poet born in Tiruvannamalai. According to regional tradition, he spent his early years as a rioter and seducer of women. After ruining his health, he tried to commit suicide by throwing himself from the northern tower of Annamalaiyar Temple, but was saved by the grace of god Murugan. He became a staunch devotee and composed Tamil hymns glorifying Murugan, the most notable being Tiruppugaḻ. Arunagirinathar visited various Murugan temples and on his way back to Tiruvannamalai, visited Palani and sung praises about Swaminathaswamy. Tiruparamkundram is considered the first of the six abodes. This is the only temple where the abhishekam is performed for the divine spear called vel instead of Murugan. Palani is considered the most prominent abodes of Murugan.

Practices
One of the main traditions of the six temples, is the tonsuring of devotees, who vow to discard their hair in imitation of the Palani deity. Another is the anointing of the head of the presiding deity's idol with sandalwood paste, at night, prior to the temple being closed for the day.

List

References

Murugan temples in Tamil Nadu
Kaumaram
Temples in Tamil Nadu
Shaivism
Kartikeya temples